Arnold Kruiswijk (born 2 November 1984) is a former Dutch professional footballer who played as a left back.

Club career
Born in Groningen, Kruiswijk started his career at local side Groningen.

In the 10 September 2006 match against Heracles Almelo, Kruiswijk scored the fastest own goal ever in the Eredivisie, misplacing a back pass to the keeper that ended up in the goal after 9 seconds.

After the 2007–08 season, Kruiswijk moved to the Belgian club RSC Anderlecht.

In January 2010, Kruiswijk went on loan to Dutch side Roda JC until the end of the season. On 21 May 2010 he signed a four-year contract for SC Heerenveen, where he was reunited with his former Groningen-coach Ron Jans. In 2014, he moved to Vitesse.

On 1 July 2014, preceding his release from Heerenveen, Kruiswijk joined fellow Eredivisie side Vitesse. Kruiswijk entered the Dutch history books for a second time on 29 January 2017, when he played 25,128 minutes without scoring a goal for his club thus surpassing the record held by John Veldman. Soon after, on 10 March 2017 in an Eredivisie home fixture against Sparta Rotterdam, he scored his first goal in 362 career appearances.

He played as Vitesse won the final of the KNVB Cup 2–0 against AZ Alkmaar on 30 April 2017 to help the club, 3-time runners up, to the title for the first time in its 125-year history.

He retired in March 2019 due to injury.

International career
In 2006, Kruiswijk was part of the Netherlands U21 squad that won the 2006 UEFA European Under-21 Football Championship in Portugal. A year later at the 2007 UEFA European Under-21 Football Championship held in the Netherlands he was again part of the squad that successfully defended their title and that qualified for the 2008 Summer Olympics by reaching the semi finals at the tournament.

Career statistics

Honours

Club
Vitesse
 KNVB Cup: 2016–17

References

External links
 
 
 Netherlands stats at OnsOranje

1984 births
Living people
Footballers from Groningen (city)
Association football defenders
Dutch footballers
Netherlands under-21 international footballers
Dutch expatriate footballers
FC Groningen players
R.S.C. Anderlecht players
Roda JC Kerkrade players
SC Heerenveen players
SBV Vitesse players
Eredivisie players
Belgian Pro League players
Expatriate footballers in Belgium